Brett Michael Brackett (born December 13, 1987) is a former American football tight end. He was signed by the Miami Dolphins as an undrafted free agent in 2011. He played college football for Penn State.

Brackett grew up in Lawrence Township, Mercer County, New Jersey, where he attended Lawrence High School.

College career
Brackett attended Penn State. In 2010, as a senior, he was the a co-captain along with Ollie Ogbu, who would later join him in the professional ranks on the Eagles roster. Though he was initially recruited as a quarterback, he converted to wide receiver where, during his senior season, he was quite formidable out of the slot. He caught 39 balls for 525 yards and 5 touchdowns in 2010.

Professional career

Miami Dolphins
After going undrafted in the 2011 NFL Draft, Brackett signed as a free agent with the Miami Dolphins on July 26, 2011.

Jacksonville Jaguars
Brackett was signed to the Jacksonville Jaguars' practice squad on October 8, 2011. He was released on October 11.

Philadelphia Eagles
Brackett was signed on November 9, 2011, to the Philadelphia Eagles practice squad. At the conclusion of the 2011 season, his practice squad contract expired and he became a free agent. He was re-signed to the active roster on January 2, 2012. Brackett was expected to compete with Clay Harbor for the number two tight end spot. It was thought that he could make the roster as a third tight end, but he was waived during the final roster cuts.

Second stint with Jaguars
Brackett was claimed by Jacksonville on September 1, 2012. He sustained a knee injury in his first practice with the team and was placed on injured reserve. He was released on September 1, 2013.

Arizona Cardinals
On January 7, 2014, Brackett was signed to a futures contract by the Arizona Cardinals. He was released on May 12, 2014.

Tennessee Titans
Brackett signed with the Tennessee Titans in September 2014.

Seattle Seahawks
Brackett was signed off waivers by the Seattle Seahawks on October 21, 2014. He was waived on October 29, 2014.

References

External links
 Philadelphia Eagles bio
 Jacksonville Jaguars bio
 Penn State Nittany Lions bio

1987 births
Living people
Lawrence High School (New Jersey) alumni
People from Lawrence Township, Mercer County, New Jersey
Sportspeople from New Brunswick, New Jersey
Players of American football from New Jersey
American football tight ends
Penn State Nittany Lions football players
Miami Dolphins players
Jacksonville Jaguars players
Philadelphia Eagles players
Arizona Cardinals players
Tennessee Titans players
Seattle Seahawks players